Sue Reno is a fiber artist from Pittsburgh, Pennsylvania.

Work
Rich and intricate art quilts reflect her local environment and incorporate imagery drawn from her studies of botany, wildlife, historic architecture, and the Susquehanna River.

She employs surface design techniques including cyanotype, mono printing, digital image transfer, and needle felting as the basis for works that also incorporate hand painted fabrics, hand and machine stitching, and beadwork.

She was one of the first group of artists involved in the fiber art postcard phenomenon and was interviewed about this topic for the "Quilters' S.O.S. - Save Our Stories" project for The Alliance For American Quilts.  The transcription and photographs are archived by the American Folklife Center at the Library of Congress. This is the interview.

Best in Show 2012  "Art Quilts XVII: Integrating a Paradox", award at the Chandler Center for the Arts for "Squirrel and Locust".

United States Department of State display in the U.S. embassy in Laos from 2011-2013 of "The Organic Garden".

Winner of the 2013 "Art of the State" Pennsylvania Museum Purchase Award and part of the Permanent Collection of the State Museum of Pennsylvania for "Silk Mill #3".  Her piece "In Dreams I Learned to Swim" was juried into the 2015 Art of the State show.

NASA's James Webb Space Telescope - In 2016, Sue was chosen by NASA as one of a few artists to visit the Goddard Space Flight Center to view and be inspired by the telescope, and to produce a unique piece of art.  It was displayed at the Goddard Space Flight Center for three months in 2017. Details on this Art Quilt "Luminosity" are documented in her blog and can be viewed here.

2nd Place for Craft at the 2020 "Art of the State" Pennsylvania Museum exhibit - Her piece, "In Dreams I Saw the Rift" can be viewed on her website or on the museum's Virtual 360 exhibit tour in Area 9.

Unfolding the Universe : A James Webb Space Telescope VR Experience - In 2022, Sue was live in the Earth Gallery of this NASA event; presenting her four artworks (First Light, Galaxy Assembly, Stellar Nurseries, Luminosity) about the James Webb Space Telescope.  Metaverse participants were able to virtually view Sue's artwork as they strolled the Earth Gallery and interacted with her.  The event was also live streamed on YouTube.  Sue is introduced here.

Media

TV/Video/DVD/Downloads 

Quilting Arts Workshop: Surface Design Essentials for the Printed Quilt - Released in the Fall of 2014, this instructional course by Sue is dedicated to teaching how to create unique fabric using four distinct surface design techniques: Thermofax, cyanotype, collagraph, and heliographic sun printing.

PBS Quilting Arts TV - Sue is featured in three episodes (1404, 1408, 1410) of this show, which began airing nationwide in 2014.  A full description of this TV series is available here.   A preview of Sue on episode 1404 can be viewed here.

HGTV Home and Garden Television - A sampling of Sue's techniques are demonstrated in a Simply Quilts  show in the episode "Abstract Quilts from Nature". It can be viewed here.

YouTube - Extensive interview of Sue by Amber Kane.  Includes a discussion of her techniques and early influences.  It can be viewed here.

Web 

SAQA Studio Art Quilt Associates - Detailed interview of Sue by Clairan Ferrono.  It can be read here.

Publications 

The piece "Tall Blue Lettuce" was on the cover of  Professional Quilter Magazine.  Other publications have showcased her work including Machine Quilting Unlimited, Quilters Newsletter  and the book Beginner's Guide to Art Quilts 

She was featured in the March 2014 issue of American Quilter Magazine with an extensive interview “The Hand of the Maker” by Marjorie L. Russell and the article “Cognitive Textile Artist Process", written by Sue,  which breaks her cognitive process down into steps that other artists and aspiring artists could find useful, regardless of their subject matter or preferred techniques.

Her piece "Jack in the Pulpit" is featured on the cover of the September 2015 issue of Machine Quilting Unlimited, along with a feature article written by her titled "Environmental Explorations"

Her latest article, "Working with Wet Cyanotype" is featured in the January/February 2018 issue of Machine Quilting Unlimited.  It's a detailed exploration of this uncommon technique.

Exhibits 

Her fiber art has been hung in many juried shows including the International Quilt Festival, Quilts=Arts=Quilts at Schweinfurth Art Center, Art Quilts XIII: Lucky Break at the Chandler Center for the Arts, and in museums including the State Museum of Pennsylvania, the Museum of Fine Arts in Bishkek, Kyrgyzstan, the International Museum of Collage, Assemblage and Construction, the Bellefonte Museum, the Robeson Gallery of Pennsylvania State University and Materials Hard and Soft. In 2010, her solo exhibit, "Transformation: The Watt & Shand Series", received critical acclaim for the chronicling of the transformation of an historic department store into the Lancaster County Convention Center.  In 2010, she unveiled a series titled "Flora and Fauna".  2012 brought new pieces titled "Ginger" and "Bamboo Emerging" into "The Garden" series and additional work in "The Structures" series of various pieces featuring the Columbia, PA Silk Mill.  Best in Show was awarded for "Squirrel and Locust" in November, 2012 at Integrating a Paradox: Art Quilts XVII   at Chandler Center for the Arts.  2013-2017 featured many additional exhibits. For example in 2016, her work was displayed in Tainan City, Taiwan; in 2017, at NASA's Goddard Space Flight Center in Greenbelt, MD and in 2022, at NASA's Unfolding the Universe : A James Webb Space Telescope VR Experience.

A complete list of her past and upcoming exhibits are linked here:

Education

Sue attended Franklin & Marshall College in Lancaster, PA, pursuing a degree in Religious Studies.

Associations 

Sue is a Professional Artist Member of Studio Art Quilt Associates (SAQA),  which features her work..  She is a Master Artisan in the Pennsylvania Guild of Craftsmen.  She was an active member of the PA Arts Experience for 10 years until its dissolution in 2017.

Family and personal life

Sue was born in Pennsylvania and is married to Wayne Reno.  They have two daughters; Stella and Alice.  She is an avid gardener, hiker and photographer.

References

External links 
 Sue Reno Home - official website
 Sue Reno Studio - official blog

American textile artists
Quilters
Living people
Year of birth missing (living people)
Women textile artists